Pyo Chang-won (born May 3, 1966) is a South Korean politician, with professional expertise in police studies and politics. He is an outspoken, self-taught and self-proclaimed expert on criminal profiling. He stated he wanted "to realize justice through politics", and announced his candidacy for the 2016 parliamentary election. He was elected to the National Assembly as a member of the Democratic Party.

Life

Political activity 
He decided not to run for reelection on the 21st National Assembly elections, instead opening the Pyo Chang-won Institute of Crime Science while also hosting a radio show at MBC and current affairs program Scandal Supervisor on JTBC (although he left in December 2020).

Controversy

In 2013, a journalist accused Pyo of plagiarism in his doctoral dissertation, and Pyo in return threatened the journalist with legal action. Later, with a letter from his doctoral advisor, Pyo denied the allegations and claimed the alleged plagiarisms were minor mistakes in citations. In 2016, additional plagiarism was found in his doctoral dissertation, but Pyo's representatives said in response that the issue of Pyo's had already been addressed, and there is no further comment to be made.

On November 28, 2016, Pyo made a remark on his political opposition of having the mind of a group rapist, based on neutralization theory. He said on Facebook that 5% of South Koreans, who remain to be supporters of President Park Geun-hye, are rationalizing their political opinion and are no different from group rapists who also rationalize their behavior in accordance with the principles of neutralization theory. Several days later on December 15, 2016, Pyo commented on TV that supporters of Park Geun-hye have similar minds as group rapists.

On November 30, 2016, Pyo released a list of politicians who opposed President Park's impeachment, now known as the Pyo Changwon List. This act was called upon by opponents as a direct act against representative democracy, an act of political terrorism, and an act against the right to vote as provided by the Constitution of South Korea.

On January 20, 2017, Pyo hosted a galleria at the parliament which included artworks satirizing Park. One such artwork was the Dirty Sleep (더러운 잠), which depicted a naked Park. Many women's rights organizations and female-oriented organizations condemned the galleria as degradation of women. The galleria was soon halted and President Moon criticized Pyo for hosting the event. Pyo was put under investigation by the Ethics Committee of the Democratic Party of Korea, and was banned from holding a post within the party for six months.

Filmography

Television shows

References

External links
 

1966 births
Living people
Members of the National Assembly (South Korea)
Minjoo Party of Korea politicians
South Korean academics
South Korean criminologists
South Korean psychologists
Criminal psychologists
People from Pohang
Pyo clan